Pollenia hazarae is a species of cluster fly in the family Polleniidae.

Distribution
India, Pakistan.

References

Polleniidae
Insects described in 1923
Diptera of Asia